Sabina Simmonds (born 17 April 1960) is a retired tennis player from Italy. She competed in the Fed Cup from 1978 to 1984.

WTA career finals

Singles: 2 (2 runner-ups)

ITF finals

Singles (7–9)

Doubles (4–5)

References

1960 births
Living people
Italian female tennis players
Italian people of English descent
Naturalised citizens of Italy
Naturalised tennis players